Henry Combe Compton (1789 – 27 November 1866) was a British Conservative Party politician.

He was elected at the 1835 general election as a Member of Parliament (MP) for South Hampshire, and held the seat until he stood down from the House of Commons at the 1857 general election.

References

External links 
 

1789 births
1866 deaths
Conservative Party (UK) MPs for English constituencies
UK MPs 1835–1837
UK MPs 1837–1841
UK MPs 1841–1847
UK MPs 1847–1852
UK MPs 1852–1857